Kouankan  is a town and sub-prefecture in the Macenta Prefecture in the Nzérékoré Region of south-eastern Guinea

Refugee camp in Kouankan

Guinea hosted nearly 29,300 refugees and asylum seekers, mostly from Liberia, Sierra Leone, and Côte d'Ivoire. By December, 11,900 refugees lived in one of Guinea's three refugee camps, Lainé, Kouankan I, and Kouankan II, and at least 9,300 registered refugees lived in urban areas.

Although nearly 100,000 Sierra Leoneans repatriated between 2000 and 2004 toward the end of Sierra Leone's decade-long civil war, some refused. Several hundred Sierra Leoneans living within and close to the former Boreah refugee camp near Kissidougou in 2007 rejected both repatriation and long-term local settlement options.

Some 8,100 Sierra Leonean refugees remained in Guinea.
Most Liberian refugees fled to Guinea in the early
1990s to escape Liberia's civil war. Their
numbers peaked at 300,000 to 400,000 by the
middle of the decade. The end of Liberia's
conflict in 1996 opened the door for large-scale
repatriation. Since 1997, some 200,000 or more
Liberians have repatriated from Guinea. Their
exact numbers, however, are uncertain because
the majority returned to Liberia spontaneously,
without assistance from the UN High
Commissioner for Refugees (UNHCR).

Most Liberian refugees lived in villages in
Guinea's Forest Region, located north of the
border with Liberia, near the Guinean towns of
Gueckedou, Macenta, and Nzerekore. Only two
UNHCR camps for Liberian refugees remained at
the end of 2000: Koyama in Nzerekore; and
Kouankan in Macenta. Early in the year, UNHCR
transferred about 9,000 Liberian refugees who
had arrived in mid-1999 to a newly established
camp in Kouankan.
The UN-assisted voluntary repatriation program for Liberians, in which 51,000 Liberians participated since 2005, ended in June. Nearly 16,000 recognized Liberian refugees remained in Guinea at year's end, but the Government claimed there were as many as 50,000, including those who had not registered, and planned to conduct a census in May 2008. The Office of the UN High Commissioner for Refugees (UNHCR) planned to encourage these refugees to move to host communities and to settle locally.

Kouankan location

Latitude of Kouankan: 8,4422 (826'31.992"N)
Longitude of Kouankan: -9,1386 (98'18.996"W)
Altitude of Kouankan: 528 m

References

.. http://www.refworld.org/docid/485f50d72.html

Sub-prefectures of the Nzérékoré Region